Emad El-Gaindi (born 11 May 1955) is an Egyptian sports shooter. He competed in the men's 25 metre rapid fire pistol event at the 1984 Summer Olympics.

References

1955 births
Living people
Egyptian male sport shooters
Olympic shooters of Egypt
Shooters at the 1984 Summer Olympics
Place of birth missing (living people)